Joseph "Joe" Aloysius Lynch (November 30, 1898 – August 1, 1965) was an American boxer who held the World Bantamweight Championship during his career. An extremely durable fighter, Lynch was never knocked out in nearly 160 bouts despite an aggressive fighting style. Statistical boxing website BoxRec lists Lynch as the #11 ranked bantamweight of all time, while The Ring Magazine founder Nat Fleischer placed him at #4. The International Boxing Research Organization rates Lynch as the 11th best bantamweight ever. He was inducted into the International Boxing Hall of Fame in 2005 within the "Old-Timer" category.

Pro career

Lynch was born in New York City. He won the world bantamweight title in 1920, defeating Pete Herman.  Herman defeated him to regain the title the following year.  Lynch regained the title from Johnny Buff after Buff defeated Herman, defended it successfully against Midget Smith, but lost in 15 rounds to Abe Goldstein in 1924.

Death
He retired in 1926 and went to live in New City, NY. After retiring from boxing, Lynch bought a farm and a gymnasium with his earnings from the ring. He later served as postmaster for New York City.

In 1965 he drowned in an accident in Sheepshead Bay, Brooklyn.  He was found floating in a New York City bay and died en route to the hospital. Foul play was suspected.

Professional boxing record
All information in this section is derived from BoxRec, unless otherwise stated.

Official record

All newspaper decisions are officially regarded as “no decision” bouts and are not counted as a win, loss or draw.

Unofficial record

Record with the inclusion of newspaper decisions to the win/loss/draw column.

See also
Boxing in the 1920s

References

External links
 
 Joe Lynch at the IBHOF.
Joe Lynch - CBZ Profile

|-

  

|-

  

1898 births
1965 deaths
Boxers from New York City
Bantamweight boxers
International Boxing Hall of Fame inductees
Deaths by drowning in the United States
American male boxers